Karamay is a 2010 documentary film by Chinese director Xu Xin about the 1994 Karamay fire. It is largely black-and-white.

References

External links
 Karamay at the 34th Hong Kong International Film Festival
 

2010 films
2010s Mandarin-language films
Chinese documentary films
Films set in China
Documentary films about China
2010 documentary films
Documentary films about disasters